The pale-legged warbler (Myiothlypis signata) is a species of bird in the family Parulidae. It is native to Argentina, Bolivia, Colombia and Peru. Its habitats include subtropical or tropical moist montane, as well as subtropical or tropical heavily degraded former forest.

References

pale-legged warbler
Birds of the Bolivian Andes
Birds of the Peruvian Andes
pale-legged warbler
pale-legged warbler
pale-legged warbler